Volcanological Survey of Indonesia is the official Indonesian government agency under Ministry of Energy and Mineral Resources which are responsible for investigating, recording, and warning about volcanoes within the Indonesian region of responsibility and geological hazard mitigation.

The full official Indonesian name is the Pusat Vulkanologi dan Mitigasi Bencana Geologi (English: Vulcanology and Geological Hazard Mitigation Center), often abbreviated to PVMBG. It is based in Bandung in West Java.

It was preceded by the Netherlands East Indies Volcanological Survey. It has also been known as the Direktorat Vulcanologi. Its main publication has been known as Berita Berkala vulkanologi.

References

External links
 Volcanological Survey of Indonesia (in Indonesian)

Volcanology
Volcano observatories
Government agencies of Indonesia
Scientific organizations based in Indonesia